The Devil's Walk is a studio album by Apparat. It was released on Mute Records on 27 September 2011.

Critical reception

At Metacritic, which assigns a weighted average score out of 100 to reviews from mainstream critics, the album received an average score of 76, based on 15 reviews, indicating "generally favorable reviews".

Track listing

Personnel
Credits adapted from liner notes.

 Sascha Ring – production, guitar, mandolin, piano, instruments
 Nackt – choir (1), production, string arrangement, guitar, mandolin, piano, instruments
 Berlin String Theory – strings
 Göteborg String Theory – strings
 Jörg Wähner – drums
 Cherie – choir (1)
 Alfredo Noguiera – guitar (3)
 Joshua Eustis – production (3, 9, 10)
 Anja Franziska Plascha – guest vocals (4)
 Thimo Pommerening – vibraphone (6)
 Charles Gorczynski – horns (9)
 Flavio Etcheto – horns (9)
 Simon Bauer – upright bass (9)
 Der Onkel – marimba (9)
 David Haller – vibraphone (9)
 Giovanni Nicoletta – mixing
 Kai Blankenberg – mastering
 Hanna Zeckau – illustration
 Carsten Aermes – layout

Charts

References

External links
 

2011 albums
Apparat (musician) albums
Mute Records albums